Richard Samuel Benjamin (born May 22, 1938) is an American actor and film director. He has starred in a number of well-known films, including Goodbye, Columbus (1969), based on the novella by Philip Roth; Catch-22 (1970), from the Joseph Heller best-seller; Westworld (1973), a science-fiction thriller by Michael Crichton; and The Sunshine Boys (1975), written by Neil Simon, for which he won the Golden Globe Award for Best Supporting Actor. He was nominated for an Emmy Award for Best Actor in a Comedy Series for his work on He & She (1968), opposite his wife Paula Prentiss.

After directing for television, his first film as a director was the 1982 comedy My Favorite Year, starring Peter O'Toole, who was nominated for an Oscar for Best Actor for the role. His other films as a director include City Heat (1984) starring Burt Reynolds and Clint Eastwood, The Money Pit (1986) starring Tom Hanks and Shelley Long, My Stepmother Is an Alien (1988) starring Dan Aykroyd and Kim Basinger, Mermaids (1990) starring Cher and Winona Ryder, Made in America (1993) starring Whoopi Goldberg and Ted Danson, Milk Money (1994) starring Melanie Griffith and Ed Harris, Mrs. Winterbourne (1996) starring Ricki Lake and Brendan Fraser, and Marci X (2003) starring Lisa Kudrow and Damon Wayans.

Biography

Early life
Benjamin was born in New York City, the son of Samuel Roger Benjamin (1910–1997), a garment industry worker. Benjamin's uncle was vaudeville comedian Joe Browning. His family was Jewish. He attended the High School of Performing Arts and graduated from Northwestern University, where he was involved in many plays and studied in the Northwestern theater school. While there, he met Paula Prentiss, whom he married in 1961.

Theatre
Benjamin struggled to get work early in his career, while Prentiss became a film star almost immediately in Where the Boys Are (1961). Benjamin appeared on stage in The Taming of the Shrew and guest-starred on shows such as The New Breed and Dr. Kildare.

Benjamin's early break came when cast in the touring company of Barefoot in the Park in 1964. During this run, he received word that Prentiss had a nervous breakdown while making What's New Pussycat? in Paris. Prentiss got treatment and made a full recovery.

Benjamin later toured in The Odd Couple with Dan Dailey. In 1966, he directed Barefoot in the Park on stage in London.

Simon was pleased with Benjamin's work and cast him in his new playThe Star-Spangled Girl (1966–67) directed by George Axelrod. Benjamin appeared alongside Anthony Perkins and Connie Stevens, and the show ran for 261 performances.

The success of the show led to Benjamin appearing in a television series with his wife Paula, He & She (1967–68). It ran for 26 episodes.

Stardom
Benjamin's first lead role in a film came with an adaptation of the Philip Roth novella, Goodbye, Columbus (1969) with Ali MacGraw. It was a critical and commercial hit.

Benjamin followed it with a key support role in the film of Catch-22 (1970). He was top billed in Diary of a Mad Housewife (1970) from the team of Eleanor and Frank Perry, appearing alongside Carrie Snodgress and Frank Langella.

He directed his wife off-Broadway in Arf/The Great Airplane Snatch (1969), which ran for five performances.

Benjamin played the lead in The Marriage of a Young Stockbroker (1971), directed by the producer and the original author of The Graduate, though it was not as successful.

He acted in a comedy, The Steagle (1971), the directorial debut of designer Paul Sylbert, which was little seen. Another box-office flop was the film of Roth's Portnoy's Complaint (1972), the sole directorial effort of Ernest Lehman.

In 1972, Benjamin returned to Broadway with The Little Black Book, which only ran for nine performances.

Benjamin then acted in two more successful films, as part of an all-star cast in The Last of Sheila (1973), from a script by Anthony Perkins and Stephen Sondheim, and in Westworld (1973), directed by Michael Crichton and co-starring Yul Brynner.

The Los Angeles Times stated that by this stage, his image was of "a whining, petulant bore by doing too good a job of acting in a series of sleazy roles." He decided to steer away from such roles by turning down a part in The Towering Inferno (which Richard Chamberlain ended up playing).

Supporting actor
Benjamin supported Walter Matthau and George Burns in the film adaptation of Neil Simon's The Sunshine Boys (1975), for which he won a Golden Globe award.

Benjamin and Prentiss starred in The Norman Conquests (1975–76) on Broadway, which went for 76 performances.

Benjamin went to Australia to make a TV film with his wife, No Room to Run (1978). In Hollywood, he supported Matthau and Glenda Jackson in House Calls (1978).

In 1978, he starred in the ambitious but short-lived television series Quark. The same year he appeared in a TV film Fame, written by Arthur Miller.

Benjamin played a frustrated fiancé of a woman who falls for the vampire Count Dracula in the surprise box-office smash Love at First Bite (1979) starring George Hamilton and Susan Saint James.

Benjamin has hosted Saturday Night Live twice. Once by himself on April 7, 1979 and the other nearly a year later on April 5, 1980 with his wife Paula Prentiss. 

Benjamin was top billed in Scavenger Hunt (1979), an ensemble film.

Benjamin had directed in theatre and was keen to do it in film. In 1979, Benjamin directed for the first time, creating a pilot for a sitcom spin-off of the film Where's Poppa? by Carl Reiner. "The pilot turned out really well," said Benjamin. "But I don't think ABC ever quite 'got' it. They never did put the show on the air... At least I could prove that I wasn't nuts, that I really had actually directed something." He directed one episode of the 1980 TV series Semi-Tough.

Benjamin had supporting roles in The Last Married Couple in America (1980), How to Beat the High Co$t of Living (1980), Witches' Brew (1980), and First Family (1980). He and Prentiss played the leads in Saturday the 14th (1981). They also began hosting corporate videos.

Feature film director
Benjamin's work on the Where's Poppa? pilot saw him offered the job as director on My Favorite Year (1982) starring Peter O'Toole. The film was warmly received, earning O'Toole an Oscar nomination for Best Actor and launched Benjamin as a director.

Benjamin and Prentiss returned to acting with the TV movie Packin' It In (1983). He said, "If I get a wonderful script to act in and a mediocre script to direct, I'll act. And the same principle applies the other way around. It's the material that counts." He focused on directing, though, for the next decade. Benjamin's second feature as director was Racing with the Moon (1984) from a script by Steve Kloves starring Sean Penn and Nicolas Cage. He was then called in at short notice to replace Blake Edwards on City Heat (1984) with Clint Eastwood and Burt Reynolds, which was a critical and commercial disappointment.

Benjamin directed a comedy for Steven Spielberg's company, The Money Pit (1986) with Tom Hanks and Shelley Long. He then directed a thriller Little Nikita (1988) with Sidney Poitier and River Phoenix, and a comedy with Dan Aykroyd, My Stepmother Is an Alien (1988). Benjamin did another comedy, Downtown (1990), with Anthony Edwards and Forest Whitaker. He had a moderate hit with Mermaids (1990) starring Cher and Winona Ryder.

Made in America (1993) with Whoopi Goldberg and Ted Danson was also successful. Milk Money (1994) with Melanie Griffith and Ed Harris was less so. He also directed Mrs. Winterbourne (1996).

In the 1990s, Benjamin returned to acting with appearances on shows including The Ray Bradbury Theater, Love & War, Ink, Mad About You, and Titus, as well as the films Deconstructing Harry (1997), Keeping Up with the Steins (2006), and Henry Poole Is Here (2008).

TV directing
In 1998, Benjamin and Prentiss performed Power Plays on stage. Benjamin did some directing for TV – The Pentagon Wars (1998), Tourist Trap (1999), The Sports Pages (2001), and Laughter on the 23rd Floor (2001) from the play by Neil Simon. Benjamin returned to features with The Shrink Is In (2001) and Marci X (2003), in which he also had a small role.

He produced and directed a TV adaptation of Simon's The Goodbye Girl (2004) with Jeff Daniels and Patricia Heaton. In 2006, Benjamin directed the award-winning cable television drama A Little Thing Called Murder, starring Australian Judy Davis. It was based on the true story of Sante and Kenny Kimes, mother and son grifters and killers. His later acting appearances on television include Ray Donovan and Childrens Hospital. He most recently played Dr. Green in the Netflix comedy film You People (2023) opposite Jonah Hill and Julia Louis-Dreyfus.

Personal life
He married actress Paula Prentiss on October 26, 1961; they have two children who are also actors: Ross Benjamin and Prentiss Benjamin.

Filmography

As actor

Film

Television

As director

References

Further reading 
 Dye, David. Child and Youth Actors: Filmography of Their Entire Careers, 1914–1985. Jefferson, North Carolina: McFarland & Co., 1988, p. 17.

External links

1938 births
Living people
Male actors from New York City
American male film actors
American male television actors
Best Supporting Actor Golden Globe (film) winners
Comedy film directors
Jewish American male actors
Northwestern University School of Communication alumni
Film directors from New York City
Fiorello H. LaGuardia High School alumni
21st-century American Jews